The Hefei railway station is a major railway station in Hefei, Anhui, China.

It was built in 1934, and served as of 2019 by the Hening Passenger Railway, Western Union Railway, Huainan Railway and Hefei–Jiujiang railway.

Railway stations in Anhui
Railway stations in China opened in 1934
Transport in Hefei